The following television stations operate on virtual channel 27 in the United States:

 K12XK-D in Boulder, Colorado
 K12XQ-D in Monroe, Louisiana
 K14NJ-D in Hot Springs, Montana
 K18GG-D in Mina/Luning, Nevada
 K20JX-D in Sacramento, California
 K25OB-D in San Antonio, Texas
 K26CI-D in Cortez, etc., Colorado
 K26JC-D in Walker Lake, Nevada
 K26JI-D in Sibley, Iowa
 K27AE-D in Victorville, etc., California
 K27DO-D in Bend, etc., Oregon
 K27JP-D in Little Rock, Arkansas
 K27MQ-D in St. George, Utah
 K27OY-D in Memphis, Tennessee
 K27PC-D in Yuma, Arizona
 K27PE-D in Gustine, California
 K32EY-D in Dove Creek, etc., Colorado
 K33GZ-D in Hawthorne, Nevada
 K33PV-D in Rock Rapids, Iowa
 KAOB-LD in Beaumont, Texas
 KBAX-LD in Twin Falls, Idaho
 KBKI-LD in Boise, Idaho
 KCPM in Grand Forks, North Dakota
 KCWS-LD in Sioux Falls, South Dakota
 KCWV in Duluth, Minnesota
 KDFI in Dallas, Texas
 KDKJ-LD in Tyler, Texas
 KELV-LD in Las Vegas, Nevada
 KFDY-LD in Lincoln, Nebraska
 KGHB-CD in Pueblo, etc., Colorado
 KGJT-CD in Grand Junction, Colorado
 KHGI-CD in North Platte, Nebraska
 KHTV-CD in Los Angeles, California
 KJKZ-LP in Fresno, California
 KLDO-TV in Laredo, Texas
 KLWY in Cheyenne, Wyoming
 KNXG-LD in College Station, Texas
 KOHA-LD in Omaha, Nebraska
 KOZL-TV in Springfield, Missouri
 KPCD-LD in San Fernando, California
 KREN-TV in Reno, Nevada
 KRPV-DT in Roswell, New Mexico
 KSCD-LD in Hemet, California
 KSIN-TV in Sioux City, Iowa
 KSKC-CD in Pablo/Ronan, Montana
 KSLM-LD in Dallas, Oregon
 KSNT in Topeka, Kansas
 KUAS-TV in Tucson, Arizona
 KUCO-LD in Chico, California
 KUKR-LD in Santa Rosa, California
 KWBH-LD in Rapid City, South Dakota
 KWTC-LD in Kerrville, Texas
 KYMB-LD in Monterey, California
 KYPO-LD in Tacna, Arizona
 W15DC-D in Florence, South Carolina
 W15ES-D in Myrtle Beach, South Carolina
 W26FE-D in Montgomery, Alabama
 W27AU-D in Wausau, Wisconsin
 W27DK-D in Columbus, Georgia
 W27DP-D in New Bern, North Carolina
 W27DQ-D in Elmhurst, Michigan
 W27EO-D in Panama City, Florida
 W27EP-D in Destin, Florida
 W27EQ-D in Peoria, Illinois
 W27ET-D in Maple Valley, Michigan
 WBGU-TV in Bowling Green, Ohio
 WCCU in Urbana, Illinois
 WCMV in Cadillac, Michigan
 WCQT-LD in Cullman, Alabama
 WFXR in Roanoke, Virginia
 WGEI-LD in Enterprise, Alabama
 WGNT in Portsmouth, Virginia
 WGZT-LD in Key West, Florida
 WHJC-LP in Williamson, West Virginia
 WHTM-TV in Harrisburg, Pennsylvania
 WIRP-LD in Raleigh, North Carolina
 WKBN-TV in Youngstown, Ohio
 WKOW in Madison, Wisconsin
 WKYT-TV in Lexington, Kentucky
 WLNM-LD in Lansing, Michigan
 WLOV-TV in West Point, Mississippi
 WLPB-TV in Baton Rouge, Louisiana
 WNAL-LD in Scottsboro, Alabama
 WNYK-LD in Teaneck, New Jersey
 WOCD-LD in Dunnellon, Florida
 WQEC in Quincy, Illinois
 WRDQ in Orlando, Florida
 WRJA-TV in Sumter, South Carolina
 WSOT-LD in Marion, Indiana
 WTCT in Marion, Illinois
 WTNB-CD in Cleveland, Tennessee
 WTXL-TV in Tallahassee, Florida
 WUNW in Canton, North Carolina
 WUTF-TV in Worcester, Massachusetts
 WWAX-LD in Westmoreland, New Hampshire
 WWRJ-LD in Jacksonville, Florida
 WXSG-LD in Springfield, Illinois
 WYJJ-LD in Jackson, Tennessee

The following stations, which are no longer licensed, formerly operated on virtual channel 27 in the United States:
 K11XT-D in Mariposa, California
 K20CP-D in Elmo, Montana
 K27EC-D in Lake Havasu City, Arizona
 K27MG-D in Columbia, Missouri
 KEXT-CD in San Jose, California
 KILW-LD in Rochester, Minnesota
 KNYS-LD in Natchitoches, Louisiana
 KULG-LD in Springfield, Missouri
 W27DH-D in Evansville, Indiana
 W27DV-D in Bluffton–Hilton Head, Georgia
 WDYH-LD in Augusta, Georgia
 WUDI-LD in Myrtle Beach, South Carolina

References

27 virtual